Oenopota pavlova is a species of sea snail, a marine gastropod mollusk in the family Mangeliidae.

Description
The length of the shell varies between 7.5 mm and 20 mm.

(Original description) The white shell is thin and delicate. It contains six or more whorls, the protoconch eroded. The spiral sculpture consists of fine striae with wider flat interspaces minutely cut into segments by close regular incremental lines. The whorls are subangulate at the shoulder. The axial sculpture consists of sharp, sigmoid riblets (22 or more on the penultimate whorl) obsolete on the base and on most of the body whorl. The anal sulcus is wide and shallow. The aperture is simple. The inner lip is erased.

Distribution
This marine species was found off the Pribilof Islands, Bering Sea

References

External links
  Tucker, J.K. 2004 Catalog of recent and fossil turrids (Mollusca: Gastropoda). Zootaxa 682:1–1295.
 

pavlova
Gastropods described in 1919